Ávila Camacho railway station is the interchange station between SITEUR's Lines 1 and 3 in Guadalajara, Mexico.

The logo is a stylization of the presidential sash used by President Manuel Ávila Camacho during his six-year term 1940–1946; and takes its name from the homonymous avenue with which the underground section of line 1 crosses.

The station provides service to the San Miguel de Mezquitán, La Normal and Observatorio neighborhoods. Additionally, it is a strategic connection point in the city since it links with various bus routes in the city, which serve the municipalities of Zapopan and Guadalajara.

Points of interest
 Urban Primary School María C. Reyes
 Plan de San Luis and Enrique Díaz de León avenues
 Federalismo cycleway, which runs from Manuel Ávila Camacho Av. until Circunvalación Agustín Yáñez Av
 San Miguel de Mezquitán Colony
 SNTE Section 47 Syndicate Offices
 San Miguel de Mezquitán Park & Parish

Gallery

References

External links

 

Buildings and structures in Guadalajara, Jalisco
Guadalajara light rail system Line 1 stations
Guadalajara light rail system Line 3 stations
Railway stations in Guadalajara
Railway stations opened in 2020
Railway stations opened in 1989
Railway stations located underground in Mexico